Transancistrus santarosensis is a species of catfish in the family Loricariidae. It is a freshwater fish native to South America, where it occurs in the basin of the Santa Rosa River, which is part of the Gulf of Guayaquil drainage in Ecuador. The species reaches 7.7 cm (3 inches) SL.

References 

Fish described in 2012
Loricariidae